Macclesfield Rural District was a rural district of Cheshire, England from 1894 to 1974.

Macclesfield as a Municipal Borough and Bollington as an urban district formed an enclave which was surrounded by Macclesfield RD.

The district was formed in 1894 based on Macclesfield rural sanitary district by the Local Government Act 1894. It was abolished under the Local Government Act 1972 in 1974 and became part of the new Macclesfield borough, which was itself abolished in 2009.

Civil parishes within the former area 

 Adlington
 Bosley
 Chelford
 Chorley
 Eaton
 Gawsworth
 Great Warford
 Henbury
 Higher Hurdsfield
 Kettleshulme
 Knutsford
 Lyme Handley
 Macclesfield Forest
 Marton
 Mottram St. Andrew
 Nether Alderley
 North Rode
 Over Alderley
 Pott Shrigley
 Poynton-with-Worth
 Prestbury
 Rainow
 Siddington
 Snelson
 Sutton
 Wildboarclough
 Wincle
 Withington

Notes

History of Cheshire
Former districts of Cheshire
Districts of England created by the Local Government Act 1894
Districts of England abolished by the Local Government Act 1972
Rural districts of England